Chowna Mein is an Indian politician from Arunachal Pradesh, who has been serving as the state’s Deputy Chief Minister since July 2016 under the present Government formed by Bharatiya Janata Party (BJP), with Pema Khandu as its Chief Minister. Mein holds the portfolio of Finance & Investment, Power & Non Conventional Energy Resources, Tax & Excise, State Lotteries, and Economics & Statistics.

Prior to his role as Deputy Chief Minister under the present BJP-formed Government, Mein also held the post of Deputy Chief Minister in the state of Arunachal Pradesh from March 2016 to July 2016 under the Government formed by former Chief Minister Kalikho Pul. After the brief Government formed by Pul, Pema Khandu was sworn in as the 9th Chief Minister of Arunachal Pradesh in July 2016, during which Chowna Mein was also sworn in as Deputy Chief Minister of the state.

On 21 December 2016, Pema Khandu, along with Chowna Mein and 5 other MLAs were suspended from the People's Party of Arunachal by the party president, and Takam Pario was named as the next likely Chief Minister of Arunachal Pradesh replacing Khandu. However, in a fast-paced development, a BJP Government was established in the state, after 33 out of 43 PPA MLAs joined the party. The newly formed Government by BJP in Arunachal Pradesh continued with the previous cabinet established under Chief Minister Pema Khandu, implying that Chowna Mein continued to serve as the Deputy Chief Minister under the new Government.

Early life 
Chowna Mein was born on 2 December 1950 at Sunpura, Lohit district, Arunachal Pradesh to a Tai Khamti family. His father is Late Chow Pook Gohain, one of the founding fathers of Arunachal Pradesh; who was elected as the first agency council in 1969, then a member of the Agency Council till 1972. At the time, Arunachal Pradesh was renamed from North East Frontier Agency (NEFA) and made a Union Territory (UT).

Mein is an alumnus of Don Bosco School, Guwahati and Jawaharlal Nehru University, Delhi. His family has long been associated with the political field, and hence his entry into politics can be seen as a natural inclination towards carrying forward his family legacy. Apart from his father, Mein’s elder brother, Chow Tewa Mein has remained an elected member of the Pradesh Council in 1972; and his maternal uncles, Chow Khamoon Gohain and Chow Chandret Gohain have both remained elected members of the Legislative Assembly.

Political career 
Chowna Mein started his political career in 1995, when he was elected as a Member of the Legislative Assembly from the 48th Lekang (ST) Assembly Constituency of the Namsai district (then Lohit) of Arunachal Pradesh. He was elected consecutively for 6 (six) times by the people of 48-Lekang during 1995, 1999, 2004, 2009, 2014 Assembly elections.

In 2019, he changed his constituency  and was elected as the Member of the Legislative Assembly for the 46th Chowkham-Wakro constituency during the 2019 assembly elections. On May 29, 2019, Chowna Mein was sworn in as the Deputy Chief Minister after Pema Khandu was sworn in as the Chief Minister of Arunachal Pradesh.

Roles undertaken in his political career

Achievements 
Chowna Mein received the Lachit Barphukan Award 2022 from Tai-Ahom in honour of his selfless achievements in furthering the welfare of society and preserving Tai culture.

See also
Arunachal Pradesh Legislative Assembly

References

Living people
People from Lohit district
Indian National Congress politicians
People's Party of Arunachal politicians
Deputy Chief Ministers of Arunachal Pradesh
Arunachal Pradesh MLAs 2014–2019
Bharatiya Janata Party politicians from Arunachal Pradesh
1950 births